Kantakapalli or Kantakapalle is a village and panchayat in Kothavalasa mandal of Vizianagaram district, Andhra Pradesh, India.

There is a railway station in Kantakapalli in Waltair division of East Coast Railway, Indian Railways.

Demographics
According to Indian census, 2001, the demographic details of this village is as follows:
 Total Population: 	2,613 in 724Households.
 Male Population: 	1,273
 Female Population: 	1,340
 Children Under 6-years of age: 287 (Boys - 126 and Girls - 161)
 Total Literates: 	2,463

References

External links
 Kantakapalli village and railway station at Google Maps.

Villages in Vizianagaram district